Deivydas Matulevičius (born 8 April 1989) is a Lithuanian footballer who plays as a striker for I Lyga club Dainava. Matulevičius has previously played for Interas-AE Visaginas, FC Vilnius and Žalgiris Vilnius in Lithuania, Odra Wodzisław, Cracovia and Reșița in Poland, Pandurii Târgu Jiu, FC Botoșani and Rapid București in Romania, Tobol in Kazakhstan, Royal Mouscron in Belgium, Hibernian in Scotland and Glentoran in Northern Ireland.

Career

Club
Matulevičius signed a two-year contract with Hibernian in July 2017. He scored in a 5–0 Scottish League Cup win against Ayr United on 8 August, but made few appearances and was made available for transfer in December. He was subsequently released from his contract on 31 January 2018.

In January 2020, Matulevičius signed for Glentoran.

In 2021, Matulevičius joined Lithuanian club Dainava.

Honours
Rapid București
Liga III: 2018–19

Individual
 A Lyga Top Scorer: 2011 (19 goals)

International
As of match played 10 June 2017. Lithuania score listed first, score column indicates score after each Matulevičius goal.

References

External links 
 
 

1989 births
Living people
Sportspeople from Alytus
Lithuanian footballers
Lithuania under-21 international footballers
Lithuania international footballers
Association football forwards
Interas-AE Visaginas players
FC Vilnius players
FK Žalgiris players
Odra Wodzisław Śląski players
MKS Cracovia (football) players
CS Pandurii Târgu Jiu players
FC Tobol players
FC Botoșani players
FC Rapid București players
Royal Excel Mouscron players
CSM Reșița players
A Lyga players
Ekstraklasa players
Liga I players
Kazakhstan Premier League players
Lithuanian expatriate footballers
Lithuanian expatriate sportspeople in Poland
Expatriate footballers in Poland
Lithuanian expatriate sportspeople in Romania
Expatriate footballers in Romania
Lithuanian expatriate sportspeople in Kazakhstan
Expatriate footballers in Kazakhstan
Lithuanian expatriate sportspeople in Belgium
Expatriate footballers in Belgium
Hibernian F.C. players
Expatriate footballers in Scotland
Lithuanian expatriate sportspeople in Scotland
Scottish Professional Football League players
Glentoran F.C. players
FK Dainava Alytus players
FK Kauno Žalgiris players